"Homely Girl" is a song by American vocal group the Chi-Lites. Release in 1974, it reached number five on the UK Singles Chart, number three on the US Hot Soul Singles chart, and number 54 on the US Billboard Hot 100. A cover by UB40 also became a hit between 1989 and 1991 in several countries.

Charts

UB40 version

A cover version by UB40, from their ninth studio album, Labour of Love II (1989), was released as a single on November 6, 1989, in the United Kingdom. This cover reached the top 10 in the UK, France, the Netherlands, and New Zealand. In France, the song was used in a television advertisement for the Lee Cooper jeans. David Giles of Music Week deemed "Homely Girl" as "UB40's best for a while", adding: "It's a mark of a truly great band to be able to perform a cover version so convincingly that you end up thinking they've written it themselves".

Track listings
7-inch single
 "Homely Girl" – 3:22 	
 "Gator" (instrumental) – 4:01 	

12-inch single
 "Homely Girl" (extended mix) – 7:29 	
 "Gator" (instrumental) – 4:01
 "Homely Girl" – 3:22 	

CD single
 "Homely Girl" – 3:22 	
 "Gator" (instrumental) – 4:01 	
 "Homely Girl" (extended mix) – 7:29

Charts

Weekly charts

Year-end charts

Certifications

Other versions
In 1974, Jackie Robinson, lead singer of The Pioneers, released a cover version in the UK on Trojan Records' subsidiary label Harry J (catalogue number HJ6674). It was this reggae version that inspired UB40, whose "Labour of Love" albums are cover versions of reggae tracks of the 1960s and 1970s.

References

1974 songs
1989 singles
1991 singles
Brunswick Records singles
The Chi-Lites songs
Songs written by Eugene Record
UB40 songs
Virgin Records singles